This is a list of properties and districts in Coweta County, Georgia that are listed on the National Register of Historic Places (NRHP).

Current listings

|}

References

Coweta
Coweta County, Georgia